The Rock Creek State Bank, on Main St. in Joliet, Montana, was listed on the National Register of Historic Places in 1986.

It was built as a bank during 1906-07 for the Joliet Bank, which was organized in 1904. In 1985, it was a lodge hall for the Rebekah Lodge.

References

		
National Register of Historic Places in Carbon County, Montana
Romanesque Revival architecture in Montana
Commercial buildings completed in 1906
1906 establishments in Montana
Bank buildings on the National Register of Historic Places in Montana
Clubhouses on the National Register of Historic Places in Montana
Odd Fellows buildings in Montana
History of women in Montana
Women's clubs in the United States